Smoke Run (also spelled as Smokerun) is an unincorporated community in Clearfield County, Pennsylvania, United States. Smoke Run has a post office with ZIP code 16681.

References

Unincorporated communities in Clearfield County, Pennsylvania
Unincorporated communities in Pennsylvania